Icon Bay is a residential high-rise in the Edgewater neighborhood of Miami, Florida, containing about 300 units over 42 floors. In return for using the end of a city of Miami owned street where it meets Biscayne Bay, the project design approved included a small public park as appeasement. In 2016, the building was awarded sixth place in the Emporis best new skyscraper annual awards.

Design
The developer designed the building so that each unit can be cross-ventilated. Each unit has 2-3 frontages in order to achieve this. The balconies are designed with a zig-zag pattern which: the design element invites more light into the apartments.

The building has 300 one, two and three bedroom apartment/units.

See also
List of tallest buildings in Miami

Further reading
Best Tall Buildings: CTBUH Awards: A Global Overview of 2016 Skyscrapers

References

External links
Icon Bay Residences

Residential skyscrapers in Miami
2015 establishments in Florida
Residential buildings completed in 2015